10 is the tenth studio album by American country music artist John Anderson. It was released in 1988 as his last studio album for MCA Nashville, before leaving for BNA Records in 1992. The album produced the singles: "If It Ain't Broke, Don't Fix It," "Down in the Orange Grove" and "Lower on the Hog".

Track listing

Personnel
 Donna Anderson - background vocals
 John Anderson - lead vocals, background vocals
 Buddy Emmons - steel guitar
 John Barlow Jarvis - keyboards
 Mike Jordan - DX-7, synthesizer, organ
 Larrie Londin - drums, percussion
 Michael Rhodes - bass guitar
 Joe Spivey - fiddle
 Billy Joe Walker - acoustic guitar
 Deanna Anderson Walls - background vocals
 Curtis "Mr. Harmony" Young - background vocals
 Reggie Young - electric guitar

Chart performance

Album

Singles

References

1988 albums
John Anderson (musician) albums
Albums produced by Jimmy Bowen
MCA Records albums